Mariia Olegovna Ignateva (born 15 October 2003) is a Russian-born ice dancer who represents Hungary. With her skating partner, Danijil Szemko, she is the 2022 CS Denis Ten Memorial Challenge bronze medalist, 2022 Jégvirág Cup champion, the 2021 Volvo Open Cup silver medalist, a two-time Santa Claus Cup silver medalist (2022–23), and a two-time Hungarian national champion (2022–23).

Career

Early career 
Ignateva began skating in 2006 in her hometown of Yekaterinburg. Her first ice dance partner was Alexander Aleksanyan, with whom she competed for two seasons beginning in 2016–17. Ignateva then teamed up with Mikhail Bragin for two seasons, finishing eleventh at the 2019 Russian Championships and 13th in 2020.

2020–2021 season 
In January 2021, coach Nóra Hoffmann announced that Ignateva would team up with Danijil Szemko to compete for Hungary.

2021–2022 season 
Ignateva/Szemko made their international competitive debut at the 2021 CS Lombardia Trophy, where they placed seventeenth. They were then sixth at the Budapest Trophy before winning silver medals at the Volvo Open Cup and the Santa Claus Cup. At the 2022 Four National Championships, Ignateva/Szemko earned the bronze medal behind Poland's Kaliszek/Spodyriev and Taschlerová/Taschler of the Czech Republic, as well as the Hungarian national title. They were assigned to the 2022 European Championships, where they finished eighteenth overall. Ignateva/Szemko competed at the Jégvirág Cup in February and won their first international title together. They finished the season making the World Championship debut, finishing twenty-second.

2022–2023 season 
Beginning the season on the Challenger circuit, Ignateva/Szemko were eighth at the 2022 CS Nepela Memorial and seventh at the 2022 CS Budapest Trophy. They won the bronze medal at the 2022 CS Denis Ten Memorial Challenge, their first Challenger medal, and then repeated as silver medalists at the Santa Claus Cup. They finished second in the standings at the 2023 Four National Championships, behind only Czechs Taschlerová/Taschler, thus winning the Hungarian national title for a second consecutive year.

Ignateva/Szemko finished tenth at the 2023 European Championships.

Programs 
 With Szemko

Competitive highlights 
CS: Challenger Series

With Szemko

With Bragin

References

External links 
 
 

2003 births
Living people
Hungarian female ice dancers
Russian female ice dancers
Sportspeople from Yekaterinburg